Replenish is the debut studio album by British alternative rock band Reef. Produced by the band and Clive Martin, the album was released on 19 June 1995 supported by the singles "Good Feeling" and "Naked". Replenish peaked at number nine on the UK Albums Chart.

Reception

Allmusic gave the album three out of five stars, while rock magazine Kerrang! ranked the album tenth on their 1995 "Albums of the Year" list.

Track listing

Personnel
Reef personnel
Gary Stringer – vocals, production, mixing
Kenwyn House – guitars, production, mixing
Jack Bessant – bass, acoustic guitar, backing vocals, production, mixing
Dominic Greensmith – drums, production, mixing
Additional personnel
Clive Martin – production, mixing
Paul Cohen – design, photography

Charts

Certifications

References

1995 debut albums
Reef (band) albums